Importance is a property of things that matter or make a difference. Importance or Important may also refer to:

 Notability, being worthy of notice, having fame, or being considered to be of a high degree of interest, significance, or distinction
 Social status, the measurement of importance within society
 Value (ethics), degree of importance of some thing or action
 Important Records, an American independent record label

See also
 Priority (disambiguation)